Guru Shabad Ratnakar Mahan Kosh (Punjabi: ਗੁਰਸ਼ਬਦ ਰਤਨਾਕਰ ਮਹਾਨ ਕੋਸ਼), known by its more popular name of Mahan Kosh (ਮਹਾਨ ਕੋਸ਼), is a Punjabi language encyclopedia which was compiled by Bhai Kahn Singh Nabha over fourteen years. It was the first Punjabi encyclopedia, it contains more than 70,000 words, some of them has sufficient reference from Guru Granth Sahib, Dasam Granth, Gur Pratap Suraj Granth and from other Sikh books. It is considered a groundbreaking work in terms of its impact and its level of scholarship.

Dictionary
Mahan Kosh has 64,263 entries arranged in the alphabetical order of the Gurmukhi script covering religious and historical terms in the Sikh canon. Each entry records the etymology and different meanings of a term "according to its usage at different places in different works" alongside textual quotations.

When words of Perso-Arabic or Sanskrit origin appear they are reproduced in their original scripts to inform readers of their correct pronunciation and connotation.

Publication
While studying two existing titles, Pandit Tara Singh Narotam's Granth Guru Girarth Kos (1895) and Hazara Singh's Sri Guru Granth Kos (1899), Kahn Singh realized there would be great value in a lexicography on words occurring in Sikh historical texts as well as in the Guru Granth Sahib because it would promote literacy and critical studies in Punjabi.

On May 12, 1912 he resigned his position in Nabha State and began work on the project. His original patron, Maharaja Brijindar Singh of Faridkot State, who had earlier sponsored scholarly work on the Guru Granth Sahib died in 1918. His other patron, Maharaja Ripudaman Singh was forced to abdicate his throne in 1923. Maharaja Bhupinder Singh of Patiala State then offered to underwrite the entire expense of printing. Kahn Singh finished the work on February 6, 1926 and printing began on October 26, 1927 at the Sudarshan Press in Amritsar, owned by the poet Dhani Ram Chatrik. The first printing, in four volumes, was finished on April 13, 1930. The Languages Department of Punjab, Patiala then published Mahan Kosh in one volume and it has gone through three editions, the latest released in 1981.

The Punjabi University in Patiala has translated it into English.

References

External links
 Searchable Mahankosh is now available for Android, Click here to Install
 Mahan Kosh and some other Punjabi dictionaries in searchable form at Sri Granth
 http://punjabicomputer.com/ex-tis_fil/5190Mahankosh.pdf

1930 non-fiction books
Punjabi literature
Punjabi-language encyclopedias
1930 in India
20th-century encyclopedias
Indian encyclopedias
20th-century Indian books